Time of Miracles is a 1989 Yugoslav drama film directed by Goran Paskaljević. The film was selected as the Yugoslav entry for the Best Foreign Language Film at the 63rd Academy Awards, but was not accepted as a nominee.

Plot
The village of Bethany (modeled after the village that, according to the Bible, is located near Jerusalem where Lazarus was resurrected), September 1945, World War II has just ended. The new communist revolutionary government begins the fight against folk customs and beliefs and initiates the process of "exorcising God". The village school burned down in a fire, and the authorities break into the village church and drive out the priest. A revolutionary climbs the church and hangs the Communist flag on the cross . Other revolutionaries painted frescoes on the walls. However, after every attempt to whitewash the walls, the frescoes miraculously return. Communists perceive this act as a counter-revolutionary act. Soon the teacher dies and a stranger appears in the village.

A young man whom no one knows touches the hands of the deceased teacher on the scaffold, and raises him from the dead. The people begin to believe that Christ has arrived in their village and is performing miracles, while the communists declare the raising from the dead a counter-revolutionary act. The problem of the communists is now the teacher who rose from the dead, because the revolution does not believe in miracles. There is a conflict between two dogmas: the primitive interpretation of Communism and Christianity.

Cast

 Miki Manojlović as Nikodim
 Dragan Maksimović as Lazar
 Mirjana Karanović as Marta
 Danilo Stojković as Jovan
 Svetozar Cvetković as Young Man
 Mirjana Joković as Marija
 Ljuba Tadić as Priest Luka
 Slobodan Ninković as Ozren
 Dušan Janićijević as Limping Man
 Stole Aranđelović as Blind Man
 Ljiljana Jovanović as Mihajlo's Wife
 Neda Arnerić as Priest's Wife
 Radmila Savićević as Old Woman
 Stojan Dečermić as Judge
 Dragomir Felba as Mihajlo
 Milan Pleština as Mihajlo's Son
 Olivera Viktorović as Stanija
 Tanja Maskareli-Ostojić as Mother

See also
 List of submissions to the 63rd Academy Awards for Best Foreign Language Film
 List of Yugoslav submissions for the Academy Award for Best Foreign Language Film

References

External links
Time of Miracles Trailer 

1989 films
1989 drama films
Yugoslav drama films
Serbian drama films
Serbo-Croatian-language films
1980s Serbian-language films
Films set in Yugoslavia
Films shot in Yugoslavia
Films shot in Serbia